NESS-0327 is a drug used in scientific research which acts as an extremely potent and selective antagonist of the cannabinoid receptor CB1. It is much more potent an antagonist, and more selective for the CB1 receptor over CB2, than the more commonly used ligand rimonabant, with a Ki at CB1 of 350fM (i.e. 0.00035nM) and a selectivity of over 60,000x for CB1 over CB2.
Independently, two other groups have described only modest nanomolar CB1 affinity for this compound (125nM and
18.4nM).
Also unlike rimonabant, NESS-0327 does not appear to act as an inverse agonist at higher doses, instead being a purely neutral antagonist which blocks the CB1 receptor but does not produce any physiological effect of its own.

See also 
 Discovery and development of Cannabinoid Receptor 1 Antagonists
 NESS-040C5

References 

Cannabinoids
CB1 receptor antagonists
Hydrazides
Chloroarenes
Pyrazoles
Piperazines